Field Marshal Jan Christian Smuts,  (24 May 1870  11 September 1950) was a South African statesman, military leader and philosopher. In addition to holding various military and cabinet posts, he served as prime minister of the Union of South Africa from 1919 to 1924 and 1939 to 1948.

Smuts was born to Afrikaner parents in the British Cape Colony. He was educated at Victoria College, Stellenbosch before reading law at Christ's College, Cambridge on a scholarship. He was called to the bar at the Middle Temple in 1894 but returned home the following year. In the leadup to the Second Boer War, Smuts practised law in Pretoria, the capital of the South African Republic. He led the republic's delegation to the Bloemfontein Conference and served as an officer in a commando unit following the outbreak of war in 1899. In 1902, he played a key role in negotiating the Treaty of Vereeniging, which ended the war and resulted in the annexation of the South African Republic and Orange Free State into the British Empire. He subsequently helped negotiate self-government for the Transvaal Colony, becoming a cabinet minister under Louis Botha.

Smuts played a leading role in the creation of the Union of South Africa in 1910, helping shape its constitution. He and Botha established the South African Party, with Botha becoming the union's first prime minister and Smuts holding multiple cabinet portfolios. As defence minister he was responsible for the Union Defence Force during the First World War. Smuts personally led troops in the East African campaign in 1916 and the following year joined the Imperial War Cabinet in London. He played a leading role at the Paris Peace Conference of 1919, advocating for the creation of the League of Nations and securing South African control over the former German South-West Africa.

In 1919, Smuts replaced Botha as prime minister, holding the office until the South African Party's defeat at the 1924 general election by J. B. M. Hertzog's National Party. He spent several years in academia, during which he coined the term "holism", before eventually re-entering politics as deputy prime minister in a coalition with Hertzog; in 1934 their parties subsequently merged to form the United Party. Smuts returned as prime minister in 1939, leading South Africa into the Second World War at the head of a pro-interventionist faction. He was appointed field marshal in 1941 and in 1945 signed the UN Charter, the only signer of the Treaty of Versailles to do so. His second term in office ended with the victory of his political opponents, the reconstituted National Party at the 1948 general election, with the new government beginning the implementation of apartheid.

Smuts was an internationalist who played a key role in establishing and defining the League of Nations, United Nations and Commonwealth of Nations. He was a white supremacist who supported racial segregation and opposed democratic non-white rule, although at the end of his career his support of the Fagan Commission's recommendations marked him as a liberal segregationist by South African standards.

Early life and education

Smuts was born on 24 May 1870, at the family farm, Bovenplaats, near Malmesbury, in the Cape Colony. His parents, Jacobus Smuts and his wife Catharina, were prosperous, traditional Afrikaner farmers, long established and highly respected.

As the second son of the family, rural custom dictated that Jan would remain working on the farm. In this system, typically only the first son was supported for a full, formal education. In 1882, when Jan was twelve, his elder brother died, and Jan was sent to school in his place. Jan attended the school in nearby Riebeek West. He made excellent progress despite his late start, and caught up with his contemporaries within four years. He was admitted to Victoria College, Stellenbosch, in 1886, at the age of sixteen.

At Stellenbosch, he learned High Dutch, German, and Ancient Greek, and immersed himself in literature, the classics, and Bible studies. His deeply traditional upbringing and serious outlook led to social isolation from his peers. He made outstanding academic progress, graduating in 1891 with double first-class honours in Literature and Science. During his last years at Stellenbosch, Smuts began to cast off some of his shyness and reserve. At this time he met Isie Krige, whom he later married.

On graduation from Victoria College, Smuts won the Ebden scholarship for overseas study. He decided to attend the University of Cambridge in the United Kingdom to read law at Christ's College. Smuts found it difficult to settle at Cambridge. He felt homesick and isolated by his age and different upbringing from the English undergraduates. Worries over money also contributed to his unhappiness, as his scholarship was insufficient to cover his university expenses. He confided these worries to Professor J. I. Marais, a friend from Victoria College. In reply, Professor Marais enclosed a cheque for a substantial sum, by way of loan, encouraging Smuts to let him know if he ever found himself in need again. Thanks to Marais, Smuts's financial standing was secure. He gradually began to enter more into the social aspects of the university, although he retained a single-minded dedication to his studies.

During this time in Cambridge, Smuts studied a diverse number of subjects in addition to law. He wrote a book, Walt Whitman: A Study in the Evolution of Personality. It was not published until 1973, after his death, but it can be seen that Smuts in this book had already conceptualized his thinking for his later wide-ranging philosophy of holism.

Smuts graduated in 1894 with a double first. Over the previous two years, he had received numerous academic prizes and accolades, including the coveted George Long prize in Roman Law and Jurisprudence. One of his tutors, Professor Maitland, a leading figure among English legal historians, described Smuts as the most brilliant student he had ever met. Lord Todd, the Master of Christ's College, said in 1970 that "in 500 years of the College's history, of all its members, past and present, three had been truly outstanding: John Milton, Charles Darwin and Jan Smuts."

In December 1894, Smuts passed the examinations for the Inns of Court, entering the Middle Temple. His old Cambridge college, Christ's College, offered him a fellowship in Law. Smuts turned his back on a potentially distinguished legal future. By June 1895, he had returned to the Cape Colony, determined to make his future there.

Career

Law and politics

Smuts began to practise law in Cape Town, but his abrasive nature made him few friends. Finding little financial success in the law, he began to devote more and more of his time to politics and journalism, writing for the Cape Times. Smuts was intrigued by the prospect of a united South Africa, and joined the Afrikaner Bond. By good fortune, Smuts' father knew the leader of the group, Jan Hofmeyr. Hofmeyr in turn recommended Jan to Cecil Rhodes, who owned the De Beers mining company. In 1895, Smuts became an advocate and supporter of Rhodes.

When Rhodes launched the Jameson Raid, in the summer of 1895–96, Smuts was outraged. Feeling betrayed by his employer, friend and political ally, he resigned from De Beers, and left political life. Instead he became state attorney in the capital of the South African Republic, Pretoria.

After the Jameson Raid, relations between the British and the Afrikaners had deteriorated steadily. By 1898, war seemed imminent. Orange Free State President Martinus Steyn called for a peace conference at Bloemfontein to settle each side's grievances. With an intimate knowledge of the British, Smuts took control of the Transvaal delegation. Sir Alfred Milner, head of the British delegation, took exception to his dominance, and conflict between the two led to the collapse of the conference, consigning South Africa to war.

Psychology

Smuts was the first South African to be internationally regarded as an important psychologist. During Smuts’ undergraduate years at Cambridge University, he produced a manuscript in 1895 in which he analysed the personality of the famous American poet Walt Whitman. Due to his manuscript being considered unviable, it was only published 23 years after his death in 1973. Smuts went on to produce his next manuscript, which he completed in 1910, entitled An Inquiry into the Whole. His manuscript was then revised in 1924 and published in 1926 with the title Holism and Evolution.

Smuts had no interest in pursuing a career in psychology.  He considered psychology as "too impersonal to study great personalities", and believed that the holistic tendency of the personality would be studied best through personology. Smuts, however, never inquired further into the idea of personology due to him wanting to continue laying the foundation of the concept of holism. He never returned to either of the topics.

Holism

Although the concept of holism has been discussed by many, the term holism in academic terminology was first introduced and publicly shared in print by Smuts in the early twentieth century. Smuts was acknowledged for his contribution by getting the honour to write the first entry about the concept for the Encyclopaedia Britannica 1929 edition. The Austrian medical doctor, founder of the school of Individual Psychology, and psychotherapist, Alfred Adler (1870–1937), also showed a great interest in Smuts' book. Adler requested permission from Smuts to have the book translated to German and published in Germany.

Although Smuts' concept of holism is grounded in the natural sciences, he claimed that it has a relevance in philosophy, ethics, sociology, and psychology. In Holism and Evolution, he argued that the concept of holism is "grounded in evolution and is also an ideal that guides human development and one's level of personality actualization." Smuts stated in the book that "personality is the highest form of holism" (p. 292).

Recognition from Adler

Adler later wrote a letter, dated 31 January 1931, where he stated that he recommended Smuts’ book to his students and followers. He referred to it as "the best preparation for the science of Individual Psychology". After Smuts gave permission for the translation and publication of his book in Germany, it was translated by H. Minkowski and eventually published in 1938. During the Second World War, the books were destroyed after the Nazi government had removed it from circulation. Adler and Smuts, however, continued their correspondence. In one of Adler’s letters dated 14 June 1931, he invited Smuts to be one of three judges of the best book on the history of wholeness with a reference to Individual Psychology.

The Boer War

On 11 October 1899 the Boer republics declared war and launched an offensive into the British-held Natal and Cape Colony areas, beginning the Second Boer War of 1899–1902. In the early stages of the conflict, Smuts served as Paul Kruger's eyes and ears in Pretoria, handling propaganda, logistics, communication with generals and diplomats, and anything else that was required. In the second phase of the war, from mid-1900, Smuts served under Koos de la Rey, who commanded 500 commandos in the Western Transvaal. Smuts excelled at hit-and-run warfare, and the unit evaded and harassed a British army forty times its size. President Paul Kruger and the deputation in Europe thought that there was good hope for their cause in the Cape Colony. They decided to send General de la Rey there to assume supreme command, but then decided to act more cautiously when they realised that General de la Rey could hardly be spared in the Western Transvaal. Consequently, Smuts was left with a small force of 300 men, while another 100 men followed him. By January 1902 the British scorched-earth policy left little grazing land. One hundred of the cavalry that had joined Smuts were therefore too weak to continue and so Smuts had to leave these men with General Kritzinger. Intelligence indicated that at this time Smuts had about 3,000 men.

To end the conflict, Smuts sought to take a major target, the copper-mining town of Okiep in the present-day Northern Cape Province (April–May 1902). With a full assault impossible, Smuts packed a train full of explosives, and tried to push it downhill, into the town, in order to bring the enemy garrison to its knees. Although this failed, Smuts had proved his point: that he would stop at nothing to defeat his enemies. Norman Kemp Smith wrote that General Smuts read from Immanuel Kant's Critique of Pure Reason on the evening before the raid. Smith contended that this showed how Kant's critique can be a solace and a refuge, as well as a means to sharpen the wit. Combined with the British failure to pacify the Transvaal, Smuts' success left the United Kingdom with no choice but to offer a ceasefire and a peace conference, to be held at Vereeniging.

Before the conference, Smuts met Lord Kitchener at Kroonstad station, where they discussed the proposed terms of surrender. Smuts then took a leading role in the negotiations between the representatives from all of the commandos from the Orange Free State and the South African Republic (15–31 May 1902). Although he admitted that, from a purely military perspective, the war could continue, he stressed the importance of not sacrificing the Afrikaner people for that independence. He was very conscious that "more than 20,000 women and children have already died in the concentration camps of the enemy". He felt it would have been a crime to continue the war without the assurance of help from elsewhere and declared, "Comrades, we decided to stand to the bitter end. Let us now, like men, admit that that end has come for us, come in a more bitter shape than we ever thought." His opinions were representative of the conference, which then voted by 54 to 6 in favour of peace. Representatives of the Governments met Lord Kitchener and at five minutes past eleven on 31 May 1902, the Acting State President of the South African Republic, Schalk Willem Burger signed the Treaty of Vereeniging, followed by the members of his government, Acting State President of the Orange Free State, Christiaan De Wet, and the members of his government.

A British Transvaal

For all Smuts' exploits as a general and a negotiator, nothing could mask the fact that the Boers had been defeated. Lord Milner had full control of all South African affairs, and established an Anglophone elite, known as Milner's Kindergarten. As an Afrikaner, Smuts was excluded. Defeated but not deterred, in January 1905, he decided to join with the other former Transvaal generals to form a political party, Het Volk ('The People'), to fight for the Afrikaner cause. Louis Botha was elected leader, and Smuts his deputy.

When his term of office expired, Milner was replaced as High Commissioner by the more conciliatory Lord Selborne. Smuts saw an opportunity and pounced, urging Botha to persuade the Liberals to support Het Volk's cause. When the Conservative government under Arthur Balfour collapsed, in December 1905, the decision paid off. Smuts joined Botha in London, and sought to negotiate full self-government for the Transvaal within British South Africa. Using the thorny political issue of South Asian labourers ('coolies'), the South Africans convinced Prime Minister Sir Henry Campbell-Bannerman and, with him, the cabinet and Parliament.

Through 1906, Smuts worked on the new constitution for the Transvaal, and, in December 1906, elections were held for the Transvaal parliament. Despite being shy and reserved, unlike the showman Botha, Smuts won a comfortable victory in the Wonderboom constituency, near Pretoria. His victory was one of many, with Het Volk winning in a landslide and Botha forming the government. To reward his loyalty and efforts, Smuts was given two key cabinet positions: Colonial Secretary and Education Secretary.

Smuts proved to be an effective leader, if unpopular. As Education Secretary, he had fights with the Dutch Reformed Church, of which he had once been a dedicated member, which demanded Calvinist teachings in schools. As Colonial Secretary, he opposed a movement for equal rights for South Asian workers, led by Mohandas Karamchand Gandhi.

During the years of Transvaal self-government, nobody could avoid the predominant political debate of the day: South African unification. Ever since the British victory in the war, it was an inevitability, but it remained up to the South Africans to decide what sort of country would be formed, and how it would be formed. Smuts favoured a unitary state, with power centralised in Pretoria, with English as the only official language, and with a more inclusive electorate. To impress upon his compatriots his vision, he called a constitutional convention in Durban, in October 1908.

There, Smuts was up against a hard-talking Orange River Colony delegation, who refused every one of Smuts' demands. Smuts had successfully predicted this opposition, and their objections, and tailored his own ambitions appropriately. He allowed compromise on the location of the capital, on the official language, and on suffrage, but he refused to budge on the fundamental structure of government. As the convention drew into autumn, the Orange leaders began to see a final compromise as necessary to secure the concessions that Smuts had already made. They agreed to Smuts' draft South African constitution, which was duly ratified by the South African colonies. Smuts and Botha took the constitution to London, where it was passed by Parliament and given Royal Assent by King Edward VII in December 1909.

The Old Boers

The Union of South Africa was born, and the Afrikaners held the key to political power, as the majority of the increasingly whites-only electorate. Although Botha was appointed prime minister of the new country, Smuts was given three key ministries: Interior, Mines, and Defence. Undeniably, Smuts was the second most powerful man in South Africa. To solidify their dominance of South African politics, the Afrikaners united to form the South African Party, a new pan-South African Afrikaner party.

The harmony and co-operation soon ended. Smuts was criticised for his overarching powers, and the cabinet was reshuffled. Smuts lost Interior and Mines, but gained control of Finance. That was still too much for Smuts' opponents, who decried his possession of both Defence and Finance, two departments that were usually at loggerheads. At the 1913 South African Party conference, the Old Boers (Hertzog, Steyn, De Wet), called for Botha and Smuts to step down. The two narrowly survived a confidence vote, and the troublesome triumvirate stormed out, leaving the party for good.

With the schism in internal party politics came a new threat to the mines that brought South Africa its wealth. A small-scale miners' dispute flared into a full-blown strike, and rioting broke out in Johannesburg after Smuts intervened heavy-handedly. After police shot dead twenty-one strikers, Smuts and Botha headed unaccompanied to Johannesburg to resolve the situation personally. Facing down threats to their own lives, they negotiated a cease-fire. But the cease-fire did not hold, and in 1914, a railway strike turned into a general strike. Threats of a revolution caused Smuts to declare martial law. He acted ruthlessly, deporting union leaders without trial and using Parliament to absolve him and the government of any blame retroactively. That was too much for the Old Boers, who set up their own National Party to fight the all-powerful Botha-Smuts partnership.

First World War

During the First World War, Smuts formed the Union Defence Force. His first task was to suppress the Maritz Rebellion, which was accomplished by November 1914. Next he and Louis Botha led the South African army into German South-West Africa and conquered it (see the South-West Africa Campaign for details). In 1916 General Smuts was put in charge of the conquest of German East Africa. Col (later BGen) J.H.V. Crowe commanded the artillery in East Africa under General Smuts and published an account of the campaign, General Smuts' Campaign in East Africa in 1918. Smuts was promoted to temporary lieutenant general on 18 February 1916, and to honorary lieutenant general for distinguished service in the field on 1 January 1917.

Smuts' chief Intelligence officer, Colonel Richard Meinertzhagen, wrote very critically of his conduct of the campaign. He believed Horace Smith-Dorrien (who had saved the British Army during the retreat from Mons and was the original choice as commander in 1916) would have quickly defeated the Germans. In particular, Meinertzhagen thought that frontal attacks would have been decisive, and less costly than the flanking movements preferred by Smuts, which took longer, so that thousands of Imperial troops died of disease in the field. He wrote: "Smuts has cost Britain many hundreds of lives and many millions of pounds by his caution... Smuts was not an astute soldier; a brilliant statesman and politician but no soldier." Meinertzhagen wrote these comments in October/November 1916, in the weeks after being relieved by Smuts due to symptoms of depression, and he was invalided back to England shortly thereafter.

Early in 1917, Smuts left Africa and went to London, as he had been invited to join the Imperial War Cabinet and the War Policy Committee by David Lloyd George. Smuts initially recommended renewed Western Front attacks and a policy of attrition, lest with Russian commitment to the war wavering, France or Italy would be tempted to make a separate peace. Lloyd George wanted a commander "of the dashing type" for the Middle East in succession to Murray, but Smuts refused the command (late May) unless promised resources for a decisive victory, and he agreed with Robertson that Western Front commitments did not justify a serious attempt to capture Jerusalem. Allenby was appointed instead. Like other members of the War Cabinet, Smuts' commitment to Western Front efforts was shaken by Third Ypres.

In 1917, following the German Gotha Raids, and lobbying by Viscount French, Smuts wrote a review of the British Air Services, which came to be called the Smuts Report. He was helped in large part in this by General Sir David Henderson who was seconded to him. This report led to the treatment of air as a separate force, which eventually became the Royal Air Force.

By mid-January 1918, Lloyd George was toying with the idea of appointing Smuts Commander-in-Chief of all land and sea forces facing the Ottoman Empire, reporting directly to the War Cabinet rather than to Robertson. Early in 1918, Smuts was sent to Egypt to confer with Allenby and Marshall, and prepare for major efforts in that theatre. Before his departure, alienated by Robertson's exaggerated estimates of the required reinforcements, he urged Robertson's removal. Allenby told Smuts of Robertson's private instructions (sent by hand of Walter Kirke, appointed by Robertson as Smuts' adviser) that there was no merit in any further advance. He worked with Smuts to draw up plans, using three reinforcement divisions from Mesopotamia, to reach Haifa by June and Damascus by the autumn, the speed of the advance limited by the need to lay fresh rail track. This was the foundation of Allenby's successful offensive later in the year.

Like most British Empire political and military leaders in the First World War, Smuts thought the American Expeditionary Forces lacked the proper leadership and experience to be effective quickly. He supported the Anglo-French amalgamation policy towards the Americans. In particular, he had a low opinion of General John J. Pershing's leadership skills, so much so that he proposed to Lloyd George that Pershing be relieved of command and US forces be placed "under someone more confident, like [himself]". This did not endear him to the Americans once it was leaked.

Statesman

Smuts and Botha were key negotiators at the Paris Peace Conference. Both were in favour of reconciliation with Germany and limited reparations. Smuts was a key architect of the League of Nations through his correspondences with Woodrow Wilson, his work with the Imperial War Cabinet during the First World War and his book League of Nations: A Practical Suggestion. According to Jacob Kripp, Smuts saw the League as necessary in unifying white internationalists and pacifying a race war through indirect rule by Europeans over non-whites and segregation. Kripp states that the League of Nations mandates system reflected a compromise between Smuts's desire to annex non-white territories and Woodrow Wilson's principles of trusteeship.

He was sent to Budapest to negotiate with Béla Kun's Hungarian Soviet Republic to withdraw from unrecognized territory, and the Hungarian Communist Party's refusal to meet him led to the conference's approval of a Czechoslovak-Romanian invasion and harsher terms in the Treaty of Trianon. The Treaty of Versailles gave South Africa a Class C mandate over German South-West Africa (which later became Namibia), which was occupied from 1919 until withdrawal in 1990. At the same time, Australia was given a similar mandate over German New Guinea, which it held until 1975. Both Smuts and the Australian Prime Minister Billy Hughes feared the rising power of Japan in the post First World War world. When former German East Africa was divided into three mandated territories (Rwanda, Burundi, and Tanganyika) Smutsland was one of the proposed names for what became Tanganyika. Smuts, who had called for South African territorial expansion all the way to the River Zambesi since the late 19th century, was ultimately disappointed with the League awarding South-West Africa only a mandate status, as he had looked forward to formally incorporating the territory to South Africa. 

Smuts returned to South African politics after the conference. When Botha died in 1919, Smuts was elected prime minister, serving until a shocking defeat in 1924 at the hands of the National Party. After the death of the former American President Woodrow Wilson, Smuts was quoted as saying that: "Not Wilson, but humanity failed at Paris."

While in Britain for an Imperial Conference in June 1921, Smuts went to Ireland and met Éamon de Valera to help broker an armistice and peace deal between the warring British and Irish nationalists. Smuts attempted to sell the concept of Ireland receiving Dominion status similar to that of Australia and South Africa.

During his first premiership Smuts was involved in a number of controversies. The first was the Rand Revolt of March 1921, where aeroplanes were used to bomb white miners who were striking in opposition to proposals to allow non-whites to do more skilled and semi-skilled work previously reserved to whites only. Smuts was accused of siding with the Rand Lords who wanted the removal of the colour bar in the hope that it would lower wage costs. The white miners perpetrated acts of violence across the Rand, including murderous attacks on non-Europeans, conspicuously on African miners in their compounds, and this culminated in a general assault on the police. Smuts declared martial law and suppressed the insurrection in three days – at a cost of 291 police and army deaths, and 396 civilians killed. A Martial Law Commission was established which found that Smuts used larger forces than were strictly required, but had saved lives by doing so.

The second was the Bulhoek Massacre of 24 May 1921, when at Bulhoek in the eastern Cape eight hundred South African policemen and soldiers armed with maxim machine guns and two field artillery guns killed 163 and wounded 129 members of an indigenous religious sect known as "Israelites" who had been armed with knobkerries, assegais and swords and who had refused to vacate land they regarded as holy to them. Casualties on the government side at Bulhoek amounted to one trooper wounded and one horse killed. Once again, there were charges of the unnecessary use of overwhelming force. However, no commission of enquiry was appointed.

The third was the Bondelswarts Rebellion, in which Smuts supported the actions of the South African Administration in attacking the Bondelswarts in South West Africa. The mandatory administration moved to crush what they called a rebellion of 500 to 600 people, of which 200 were said to be armed (although only about 40 weapons were captured after the Bondelswarts were crushed).  Gysbert Hofmeyr, the Mandatory Administrator, organised 400 armed men, and sent in aircraft to bomb the Bondelswarts. Casualties included 100 Bondelswart deaths, including a few women and children. A further 468 men were either wounded or taken prisoner. South Africa's international reputation was tarnished. Ruth First, a South African anti-apartheid activist and scholar, describes the Bondelswarts shooting as "the Sharpeville of the 1920s".

As a botanist, Smuts collected plants extensively over southern Africa. He went on several botanical expeditions in the 1920s and 1930s with John Hutchinson, former botanist-in-charge of the African section of the Herbarium of the Royal Botanic Gardens and taxonomist of note. Smuts was a keen mountaineer and supporter of mountaineering. One of his favourite rambles was up Table Mountain along a route now known as Smuts' Track. In February 1923 he unveiled a memorial to members of the Mountain Club who had been killed in the First World War.

In 1925, assessing Smuts's role in international affairs, African-American historian and Pan-Africanist W. E. B. Du Bois wrote in an article which would be incorporated into the pivotal Harlem Renaissance text The New Negro,Jan Smuts is today, in his world aspects, the greatest protagonist of the white race. He is fighting to take control of Laurenço Marques from a nation that recognizes, even though it does not realize, the equality of black folk; he is fighting to keep India from political and social equality in the empire; he is fighting to insure the continued and eternal subordination of black to white in Africa; and he is fighting for peace and good will in a white Europe which can by union present a united front to the yellow, brown and black worlds. In all this he expresses bluntly, and yet not without finesse, what a powerful host of white folk believe but do not plainly say in Melbourne, New Orleans, San Francisco, Hongkong, Berlin, and London.

In December 1934, Smuts told an audience at the Royal Institute of International Affairs that:How can the inferiority complex which is obsessing and, I fear, poisoning the mind, and indeed the very soul of Germany, be removed? There is only one way and that is to recognise her complete equality of status with her fellows and to do so frankly, freely and unreservedly ... While one understands and sympathises with French fears, one cannot, but feel for Germany in the prison of inferiority in which she still remains sixteen years after the conclusion of the war. The continuance of the Versailles status is becoming an offence to the conscience of Europe and a danger to future peace ... Fair play, sportsmanship—indeed every standard of private and public life—calls for frank revision of the situation. Indeed ordinary prudence makes it imperative. Let us break these bonds and set the complexed-obsessed soul free in a decent human way and Europe will reap a rich reward in tranquility, security and returning prosperity.

Though in his Rectorial Address delivered on 17 October 1934 at St Andrews University he states that:The new Tyranny, disguised in attractive patriotic colours, is enticing youth everywhere into its service. Freedom must make a great counterstroke to save itself and our fair western civilisation. Once more the heroic call is coming to our youth. The fight for human freedom is indeed the supreme issue of the future, as it has always been.

Second World War

After nine years in opposition and academia, Smuts returned as deputy prime minister in a 'grand coalition' government under J. B. M. Hertzog. When Hertzog advocated neutrality towards Nazi Germany in 1939, the coalition split and Hertzog's motion to remain out of the war was defeated in Parliament by a vote of 80 to 67. Governor-General Sir Patrick Duncan refused Hertzog's request to dissolve parliament for a general election on the issue. Hertzog resigned and Duncan invited Smuts, Hertzog's coalition partner, to form a government and become prime minister for the second time in order to lead the country into the Second World War on the side of the Allies.

On 24 May 1941 Smuts was appointed a field marshal of the British Army.

Smuts' importance to the Imperial war effort was emphasised by a quite audacious plan, proposed as early as 1940, to appoint Smuts as Prime Minister of the United Kingdom, should Churchill die or otherwise become incapacitated during the war. This idea was put forward by Sir John Colville, Churchill's private secretary, to Queen Mary and then to George VI, both of whom warmed to the idea.

In May 1945, he represented South Africa in San Francisco at the drafting of the United Nations Charter. According to historian Mark Mazower, Smuts "did more than anyone to argue for, and help draft, the UN's stirring preamble." Smuts saw the UN as key to protecting white imperial rule over Africa. Also in 1945, he was mentioned by Halvdan Koht among seven candidates that were qualified for the Nobel Prize in Peace. However, he did not explicitly nominate any of them. The person actually nominated was Cordell Hull.

Later life

In domestic policy, a number of social security reforms were carried out during Smuts' second period in office as Prime Minister. Old-age pensions and disability grants were extended to 'Indians' and 'Africans' in 1944 and 1947 respectively, although there were differences in the level of grants paid out based on race. The Workmen's Compensation Act of 1941 "insured all employees irrespective of payment of the levy by employers and increased the number of diseases covered by the law," and the Unemployment Insurance Act of 1946 introduced unemployment insurance on a national scale, albeit with exclusions.

Smuts continued to represent his country abroad. He was a leading guest at the 1947 wedding of Princess Elizabeth and Philip, Duke of Edinburgh.
 At home, his preoccupation with the war had severe political repercussions in South Africa. Smuts' support of the war and his support for the Fagan Commission made him unpopular amongst the Afrikaner community and Daniel François Malan's pro-apartheid stance won the Reunited National Party the 1948 general election.

In 1948, he was elected Chancellor of the University of Cambridge, becoming the first person from outside the United Kingdom to hold that position. He held the position until his death two years later.

He accepted the appointment as Colonel-in-Chief of Regiment Westelike Provinsie as from 17 September 1948.

In 1949, Smuts was bitterly opposed to the London Declaration which transformed British Commonwealth into the Commonwealth of Nations and made it possible for Republics (such as the newly independent India) to remain its members. In the South African context, republicanism was mainly identified with Afrikaner Conservatism and with tighter racial segregation.

Death

On 29 May 1950, a week after the public celebration of his eightieth birthday in Johannesburg and Pretoria, Jan Smuts suffered a coronary thrombosis. He died of a subsequent heart attack on his family farm of Doornkloof, Irene, near Pretoria, on 11 September 1950.

Relations with Churchill
In 1899, Smuts interrogated the young Winston Churchill, who had been captured by Afrikaners during the Boer War, which was the first time they met. The next time was in 1906, while Smuts was leading a mission about South Africa's future to London before Churchill, then Under-Secretary of State for the Colonies. The British Cabinet shared Churchill's sympathetic view, which led to self-government within the year, followed by dominion status for the Union of South Africa in 1910. Their association continued in the First World War, when Lloyd George appointed Smuts, in 1917, to the war cabinet in which Churchill served as Munitions Minister. By then, both had formed a fast friendship that continued through Churchill's "wilderness years" and the Second World War, to Smuts's death. Lord Moran, Churchill's personal physician, wrote in his diary: Smuts is the only man who has any influence with the PM; indeed, he is the only ally I have in pressing counsels of common sense on the PM. Smuts sees so clearly that Winston is irreplaceable, that he may make an effort to persuade him to be sensible.

Churchill:Smuts and I are like two old love-birds moulting together on a perch, but still able to peck.

When Eden said at a meeting of the Chiefs of Staff (29 October 1942) that Montgomery's Middle East offensive was "petering out", after having some late night drinks with Churchill the previous night, Alanbrooke had told Churchill "fairly plainly" what he thought of Eden's ability to judge the tactical situation from a distance (Churchill was always impatient for his generals to attack at once). He was supported at the Chiefs of Staff meeting by Smuts. Alanbrooke said he was fortunate to be supported by: a flow of words from the mouth of that wonderful statesman. It was as if oil had been poured on the troubled waters. The temperamental film-stars returned to their tasks – peace reigned in the dove cot!

Views

Race and segregation
Smuts and his parties supported existing policies of racial discrimination in South Africa, taking a more moderate and ambiguous stance than the rival National Party, and he later endorsed the relatively liberal proposals of the Fagan Commission.

At the Imperial Conference of 1925 Smuts stated:

Smuts was, for most of his political life, a vocal supporter of segregation of the races, and in 1929 he justified the erection of separate institutions for blacks and whites in tones prescient of the later practice of apartheid:

In general, Smuts' view of black Africans was patronising: he saw them as immature human beings who needed the guidance of whites, an attitude that reflected the common perceptions of most non-blacks in his lifetime. Of black Africans he stated that:

Although Gandhi and Smuts were adversaries in many ways, they had a mutual respect and even admiration for each other. Before Gandhi returned to India in 1914, he presented General Smuts with a pair of sandals (now held by Ditsong National Museum of Cultural History) made by Gandhi himself. In 1939, Smuts, then prime minister, wrote an essay for a commemorative work compiled for Gandhi's 70th birthday and returned the sandals with the following message: "I have worn these sandals for many a summer, even though I may feel that I am not worthy to stand in the shoes of so great a man."

Smuts is often accused of being a politician who extolled the virtues of humanitarianism and liberalism abroad while failing to practise what he preached at home in South Africa. This was most clearly illustrated when India, in 1946, made a formal complaint in the UN concerning the legalised racial discrimination against Indians in South Africa. Appearing personally before the United Nations General Assembly, Smuts defended the policies of his government by fervently pleading that India's complaint was a matter of domestic jurisdiction. However, the General Assembly censured South Africa for its racial policies and called upon the Smuts government to bring its treatment of the South African Indians in conformity with the basic principles of the United Nations Charter.

At the same conference, the African National Congress President General Alfred Bitini Xuma along with delegates of the South African Indian Congress brought up the issue of the brutality of Smuts' police regime against the African Mine Workers' Strike earlier that year as well as the wider struggle for equality in South Africa.

In 1948, he went further away from his previous views on segregation when supporting the recommendations of the Fagan Commission that Africans should be recognised as permanent residents of White South Africa, and not merely as temporary workers who belonged in the reserves. This was in direct opposition to the policies of the National Party that wished to extend segregation and formalise it into apartheid. There is, however, no evidence that Smuts ever supported the idea of equal political rights for blacks and whites. Despite this, he did say:  The Fagan Commission did not advocate the establishment of a non-racial democracy in South Africa, but rather wanted to liberalise influx controls of blacks into urban areas in order to facilitate the supply of black African labour to the South African industry. It also envisaged a relaxation of the pass laws that had restricted the movement of blacks in general.

In the assessment of South African Cambridge professor Saul Dubow, "Smuts's views of freedom were always geared to securing the values of western Christian civilization. He was consistent, albeit more flexible than his political contemporaries, in his espousal of white supremacy."

Holism and related academic work

While in academia, Smuts pioneered the concept of holism, which he defined as "[the] fundamental factor operative towards the creation of wholes in the universe" in his 1926 book, Holism and Evolution. Smuts' formulation of holism has been linked with his political-military activity, especially his aspiration to create a league of nations. As one biographer said:
It had very much in common with his philosophy of life as subsequently developed and embodied in his Holism and Evolution. Small units must develop into bigger wholes, and they in their turn again must grow into larger and ever-larger structures without cessation. Advancement lay along that path. Thus the unification of the four provinces in the Union of South Africa, the idea of the British Commonwealth of Nations, and, finally, the great whole resulting from the combination of the peoples of the earth in a great league of nations were but a logical progression consistent with his philosophical tenets.

Zionism

In 1943 Chaim Weizmann wrote to Smuts, detailing a plan to develop Britain's African colonies to compete with the United States. During his service as Premier, Smuts personally fundraised for multiple Zionist organisations. His government granted de facto recognition to Israel on 24 May 1948. However, Smuts was deputy prime minister when the Hertzog government in 1937 passed the Aliens Act that was aimed at preventing Jewish immigration to South Africa. The act was seen as a response to growing anti-Semitic sentiments among Afrikaners.

Smuts lobbied against the White Paper of 1939, and several streets and a kibbutz, Ramat Yohanan, in Israel are named after him. He also wrote an epitaph for Weizmann, describing him as "the greatest Jew since Moses." Smuts once said:

Legacy

One of his greatest international accomplishments was the establishment of the League of Nations, the exact design and implementation of which relied upon Smuts. He later urged the formation of a new international organisation for peace – the United Nations. Smuts wrote the first draft of the preamble to the United Nations Charter, and was the only person to sign the charters of both the League of Nations and the UN. He sought to redefine the relationship between the United Kingdom and her colonies, helping to establish the British Commonwealth, as it was known at the time. This proved to be a two-way street; in 1946 the General Assembly requested the Smuts government to take measures to bring the treatment of Indians in South Africa into line with the provisions of the United Nations Charter.
  
In 1932, the kibbutz Ramat Yohanan in Israel was named after him. Smuts was a vocal proponent of the creation of a Jewish state, and spoke out against the rising antisemitism of the 1930s. A street in the Jerusalem suburb of German Colony and a boulevard in Tel Aviv are named in his honour.

The international airport serving Johannesburg was known as Jan Smuts Airport from its construction in 1952 until 1994. In 1994, it was renamed to Johannesburg International Airport to remove any political connotations. In 2006, it was renamed again to its current name, OR Tambo International Airport, for the ANC politician Oliver Tambo.

In 2004, Smuts was named by voters in a poll held by the South African Broadcasting Corporation (SABC) as one of the top ten Greatest South Africans of all time. The final positions of the top ten were to be decided by a second round of voting but the programme was taken off the air owing to political controversy and Nelson Mandela was given the number one spot based on the first round of voting. In the first round, Field Marshal Smuts came ninth.

Mount Smuts, a peak in the Canadian Rockies, is named after him.

In August 2019, the South African Army Regiment Westelike Provinsie was renamed after Smuts as the General Jan Smuts Regiment.

The Smuts House Museum at Smuts' home in Irene is dedicated to promoting his legacy.

Orders, decorations and medals
Field Marshal Smuts was honoured with orders, decorations and medals from several countries.

South Africa
 Africa Service Medal
 Dekoratie voor Trouwe Dienst
 Efficiency Decoration
 Medalje voor de Anglo-Boere Oorlog
 Union of South Africa Commemoration Medal
 Victory Medal
United Kingdom
 1914–15 Star
 1939–1945 Star
 Africa Star
 British War Medal
 Defence Medal
 France and Germany Star
 Italy Star
 King George V Silver Jubilee Medal
 King George VI Coronation Medal
 Order of Merit
 Order of the Companions of Honour
 War Medal 1939–1945

Belgium
 Grand Cordon of the Order of Leopold II (1946)
 Grand Cross of the Order of the African Star (1948)
 Grand Officer of the Order of Leopold (1917)
 Croix de Guerre (1917)
Denmark
 King Christian X's Liberty Medal (1947)
Egypt
 Grand Cross of the Order of Muhammad Ali (1947)
France
 Commander of the Legion of Honour (1917)
Greece
 Grand Cross of the Order of the Redeemer (1949)
 Gold Cross of Valour (1943)
Netherlands
 Grand Cross of the Order of the Netherlands Lion (1946)
Portugal
 Grand Cross of the Order of the Tower and Sword (1945)
United States
 European-African-Middle Eastern Campaign Medal

References

Sources

Primary

Secondary

Further reading

External links

 
 
 "Revisiting Urban African Policy and the Reforms of the Smuts Government, 1939–48", by Gary Baines
 Africa And Some World Problems by Jan Smuts at archive.org
 Holism And Evolution by Jan Smuts
 The White man's task by Jan Smuts
 

 
1870 births
1950 deaths
Afrikaner anti-apartheid activists
South African mountain climbers
People from the West Coast District Municipality
Afrikaner people
South African people of Dutch descent
South African Party (Union of South Africa) politicians
United Party (South Africa) politicians
Prime Ministers of South Africa
Defence ministers of South Africa
Finance ministers of South Africa
Members of the House of Assembly (South Africa)
20th-century South African philosophers
Alumni of Christ's College, Cambridge
Alumni of Paul Roos Gymnasium
Apartheid in South Africa
South African Republic generals
British field marshals
Chancellors of the University of Cambridge
Fellows of the Royal Society (Statute 12)
Legion of Frontiersmen members
Members of the Order of Merit
Members of the Order of the Companions of Honour
South African members of the Privy Council of the United Kingdom
Recipients of the Croix de guerre (Belgium)
Commandeurs of the Légion d'honneur
Rectors of the University of St Andrews
South African military personnel
South African people of World War I
South African people of World War II
Systems scientists
World War II political leaders
South African Zionists
South African Republic military personnel of the Second Boer War
Ministers of Home Affairs of South Africa
Justice ministers of South Africa
Members of the Dutch Reformed Church in South Africa
South African Queen's Counsel
Boer generals
Foreign ministers of South Africa
Chancellors of the University of Cape Town
Presidents of the Southern Africa Association for the Advancement of Science
South Africa and the Commonwealth of Nations